Óscar Ramírez may refer to:

Óscar Ramírez (terrorist) (born 1953), Peruvian Maoist terrorist and Shining Path leader
Oscar Ramírez (footballer, born 1961), Bolivian footballer
Óscar Ramírez (footballer, born 1964), Costa Rican footballer and manager
Óscar Ramírez (footballer, born 1984), Spanish footballer